Jill Hackland is a South African international lawn bowler.

Bowls career
Hackland won the silver medal in the women's pairs at the 2002 Commonwealth Games in Manchester.

In 2004, she won a gold medal with Trish Steyn and Loraine Victor in the women's triples.

She won the 2013 singles at the National Championships bowling for the Umhlali Bowls Club.

References

Living people
1947 births
South African female bowls players
Bowls World Champions
Commonwealth Games medallists in lawn bowls
Commonwealth Games silver medallists for South Africa
Bowls players at the 2002 Commonwealth Games
Medallists at the 2002 Commonwealth Games